The Bismarck kingfisher (Ceyx websteri) is a species of bird in the family Alcedinidae that is endemic to Papua New Guinea.

Its natural habitats are subtropical or tropical moist lowland forests, rivers, freshwater lakes, and freshwater marshes. It is threatened by habitat loss.

References

External links

BirdLife Species Factsheet.

Bismarck kingfisher
Birds of the Bismarck Archipelago
Endemic fauna of Papua New Guinea
Bismarck kingfisher
Taxonomy articles created by Polbot